Hans Mohr (born 6 August 1914, date of death unknown) was a Yugoslav athlete. He competed in the men's high jump at the 1936 Summer Olympics.

References

1914 births
Year of death missing
Athletes (track and field) at the 1936 Summer Olympics
Yugoslav male high jumpers
Olympic athletes of Yugoslavia
Place of birth missing